Syed Haji Muhammad Naushah (نوشہ) Ganj Bakhsh Qadiri (also spelled Qadri, 21 August 1552 – 18 May 1654), a scholar, saint and preacher of Islam in South Asia (today's Gujrat, Pakistan), was the founder of the Naushahia branch of the Qadiriyya Sufi order. He preached in the tenth and eleventh centuries AH (sixteenth and early seventeenth centuries AD). His adherents call themselves Qadri Naushahi, Naushahi or just Qadri (Qadiri).

Birth and names 

Syed Muhammad Naushah Ganj Bakhsh Qadri was born on the first day of Ramadan in 959 AH (21 August 1552) at Ghogganwali, district Gujrat in Punjab, Pakistan. The name of his father was Syed Ala’uddin Gilani Qadiri, who was respected for being a great Sufi of his own times. Despite all difficulties of undertaking a long journey in his days he had completed his pilgrimage to Mecca Mukarramah and Madinah Munawwarah seven times on foot, which shows how devoted to Islam he was.

At his birth he was named Muhammad. This name was kept in accordance with some divine and supernatural messages. In the first instance he became famous by the name of Haji Muhammad. Later on he also became famous by the names of Haji Nausha, Abul Hashim, Bhoora Wala Pir (the enshrouded one), Mujaddid-i Islam (the great revival of the Islam), Naushah Ganj Bakhsh, Syed Naushah Pir and Naushah Pak. The name Naushah is also spelled and pronounced as Noshah or even Nosho.

At his birth he was named Muhammad. Later on he also adopted the names Haji Naushah (Noshāh), Abul Hashim, Hazrat Naushāh Walī, Bhoora Wala Pir (the enshrouded one), Mujaddid-i Azam (the great reviver of Islam), Naushah Ganj Bakhsh, Sayyid Naushah Pir and Naushah Pak. He claimed to have received the titles "Ganj Bakhsh" and "Naushah" in the presence of God. Both names are Persian words; Ganj Bakhsh means "bestower of hidden treasures" and Naushah means a young king or a bridegroom. He was also known as Maqām-i Naushāhat.

Forebearers
Haji Muhammad Qadri was a Sayyid (direct descendant of Ahl-e-Bait of Muhammad), a 33nd-generation scion of Ali Ibn Abi Talib.It has been recorded that the first of the ancestors of Syed Naushah Ganj Bakhsh Qadri, who came to the Indo-Pakistani subcontinent, was  Sayyed Awn ibn Yala al Hashimi al Gilani. This happened by order of Syed Abdul Qadir Jilani in the fifth century AH (about the eleventh century AD). Moreover, he was an uncle of Syed Abdul Qadir Jilani and one of his spiritual successors born in 1028 in Baghdad. He is also the first person who introduced the Qadiria Order in India. He was an appointed Qutb (spiritual pole) by Syed Abdul Qadir Jilani for this Indian subcontinent. Due to his great efforts many of the Hindu tribes converted to the Islam. Among them are the tribes of Rajput, Chohan and Khokar. Most of them attained a blessed life in the religion. He returned after his mission, that he did for many years, to Baghdad where he died in 1157. In this city you can also find his holy grave.

The son and the spiritual successor of Syed Awn Ibn Yala was Syed Zaman Ali Muhsin. He spread the Islam in the southwest regions of the Indo-Pakistani subcontinent, Kohistan-i Namak and the surroundings of Saunsakesar. Many people converted due to him to the Islam and joined in his circle of Murids (spiritual disciples). His work for the religion even impressed the local ruler "Rani Bharat", who later accepted the Islam as the true religion. The holy grave of Syed Zaman Ali Shah is located in Kirana, district Sargodha in Pakistan.

Syed Mahmud Shah, better known as Pir Jalib, is one of the descendants of Syed Zaman Ali Shah. He was an outstanding saint who possessed super natural gifts, called Tasarrufat. He was also called Pir Jalib, because of his numerous benefactions and his spiritual attraction. Like his forefathers he was a spiritual perfected person. His holy burial place is in Ramdiana, district Sargodha. Syed Shamsuddin Shahid was a great saint from the descendants of Pir Jalib. He always took with him his favourite weapon, a javelin. Hence he was called Sangin Shah Shahid. He became a martyr when he died during a battle in the way of Allah. Sangin Shah had two sons: Syed Ala’uddin Husain and Syed Rahimuddin. The holy graves of both the brothers are situated in Ghogganwali, near Qadirabad in the district Gujrat, Pakistan.

Syed Ala’uddin is reckoned among the great spiritual masters of the mystical path. He observed very accurately the Shair‘ah, the Islamic laws. He had the Kunyah (a nickname indicating a parental relationship) Abu Isma‘il with the extra appellation Pir Ghazi. Among his contemporaries, just as his younger brother, he was an exceptional saint, from whom supernatural powers have been revealed till today. Syed Ala’uddin, whose holy grave is in Ghogganwali, is also the father of Syed Naushah Ganj Bakhsh Qadri

Ministry and teaching
Syed Naushah Ganj Bakhsh Qadri was a saint of Allah by birth. He was highly gifted with the qualities of intelligence and memory. The books of religious history of his times tell us that he memorised the holy Qur'an within a short period of three months only. Among his teachers in this world were Qari Qaimuddin and Shaikh Abdul Haqq.

He was widely respected and honoured for his knowledge of Tasawwuf (Islamic mysticism), because his inner experience helped him to demonstrate his superiority in his field. Actually the knowledge infinitive mysticism came to him from Allah directly (Ilm-i Ladunni). Mirza Ahmed Beg Lahori records that one night two angels came and placed their fingers into the mouth of Syed Nausha. All of a sudden he became a learned and knowledgeable man in the field of Islamic mysticism. The next morning he told his teacher about this extraordinary spiritual experience. The teacher remarked: "There is no need for you to get further knowledge from me. Perhaps on the Day of Judgement I shall be rewarded with salvation of my soul for having given a few lessons to you before this glorious spiritual experience."

Syed Naushah Pir was an expert in the religious field, like Fiqh (Islamic law), Hadith (the report of the practise and sayings of the Prophet), Tafsir (exegeses of the Qur'an), logics, philosophy and Kalam (theology concerning the tenets of belief). His comprehensive knowledge of the religion is evident from his sayings.

Beside the important languages such as Arabic and Persian he knew Kashmiri, Sanskrit and many another regional languages as well. After having Islamic knowledge, he specialized himself in spiritual exercises.

Golden Chain 
At the age of twenty-nine years Muhammad accepted Shah Sulaimān Nūri as his spiritual guide, placing him in a silsila (spiritual order or chain of saints) that stretched back to Abdul Qadir Jilani. This spiritual lineage ends via Ali Al-Murtaza at the final and Muhammad. 

 Muhammad
 Ali ibn Abu Talib
 Hasan al-Basri
 Habib al Ajami
 Dawud Tai
 Maruf Karkhi
 Sirri Saqti
 Junaid Baghdadi
 Abu Bakr Shibli
 Abdul Aziz al Tamimi
 Abul Fadl al Tamimi
 Abul Farah Tartusi
 Abul Hasan Hankari
 Abu Saeed Mubarak Makhzoomi
 Abdul Qadir Jilani
 Syed Saifuddin Abdul Wahhab
 Syed Safiuddin Abdus Sallam
 Syed Hameeduddin Ahmad
 Syed Muhiyuddin Mas`ud
 Syed Ziauddin Ali
 Syed Jamaluddin Shah Mir
 Syed Shamsuddin A'zam
 Syed Amiruddin Muhammad Ghawth
 Syed Allauddin Mubarik Haqqani
 Shah Maroof Khushabi
 Shah Sulaimān Nūri
 Muhammad Qadiri

Personal life 

Haji Muhammad was married to the daughter of Sayyid Abu Nasr Fateh Muhammad Shah of Qutb Naushehra. His mother, Main Jīwnī, arranged this marriage. He had two sons and one daughter. Their names were Sayyid Muhammad Barkhurdar, Sayyid Muhammad Hashim and Sayyida Sairah Khatoon.

He was noted for his hospitality. Mirza Ahmed Beg Lahori states that he looked after his guests personally and arranged for their food himself. Allama Jamālullah says that once he and some of his pupils stayed in Sayyid Naushah's mosque. They were highly impressed when he sent food for them from his own house. It is on record that he directed his sons to look after the guests with special care, when he entrusted the work of preaching Islam to them.

He took part in many battles. It is recorded that once a renowned wrestler named Sher Ali Khan challenged Haji Muhammad to a trial of strength. Muhammad pressed Khan's hand so powerfully that blood came out of the wrestler's fingers. The wrestler fell down at his feet and begged to be forgiven.

He usually spent his time in the mosque in teaching the holy Qur'an, leading the prayers five times a day and leading additional Nafl prayers by the riverside in the night.

Haji Muhammad attempted to put the Sunnah in practice as precisely as possible. He said: "My way of life is the Sharī'ah of the Prophet. My way of the Tarīqah is the Sharī'ah of the Prophet. The way of life of the Prophet implies also my way of life. To walk through the Sharī'ah is like walking on an illuminated way."

By day Muhammad always wore a big woollen sheet, as prescribed by the Sunnah. This piece of cloth is named bhoora in the Punjabi language, hence he was also called Bhoorawala Pir. Today, followers of his order also wear the bhoora.

Literary works 
There are many works of Sayyid Naushāh Ganj Bakhsh. As time passes they are compiled and published from manuscripts. At present there are five books of poetry and prose:
Kulliyāt-i Naushāh: (Urdu poetry) consisting of 76 Risala's and 2400 verses.
Kulliyāt-i Naushāh: (Punjabi poetry) In this work 126 Risala's of about four thousand verses are alphabetically arranged.
Ma‘ārif-i Tasawwuf: (Persian poetry) dealing with assignments on the spiritual path.
Mawā'iz-i Naushāh Pīr: (Punjabi prose) comprises delivered speeches and advices.
Ganj-ul-Asrār ("the treasure of mysteries"): a short Risala in prose ascribed to him.

According to Professor Ahmed Qureshi the following books are also written by Sayyid Naushah Pir: Diwan Urdu, Diwan Punjabi (two poems in respectively Urdu and Punjabi) and Mathnawi-ye Ganj ("The Mathnawi of Naushah Ganj Bakhsh").

Quotations

"O friend, withdraw yourself from the world."
"If you don't, you have once to do that."
"Don't spoil your time of life."
"Leave the fame of the world behind you."
"O my true friend, follow your Murshid (guide)."
"Do this in sincere surrendering in the heart with belief."
"Commemorate the Kalima, so that you will not lose it."
"The sufferings of this world and the last moment [death]."
"You can only prevail by this!"

Death 
Haji Muhammad died of natural causes on Monday, the fifteenth of the Islamic month Rabī 'ul-Awwal 1064 AH, aged one hundred and one. This date corresponds to Monday the eighteenth May 1654 A.D. He was buried in the village named Naushehra in Gujrat. His body was later interred at Ranmal Sharif in Gujrat. His grave is open to the public. The part of land on which his grave has been buried, belongs to the territory of Ranmal Sharif. The number of plot was formerly 220 and at the present 84/1.

Due to flooding in 1757 his body was transferred from its original burial site. According to tradition, when his coffin surfaced, his body was entirely intact, even his shroud was unharmed. After being damaged again by the river Chenab his coffin was finally moved to the west of Sahanpal Sharif. In 1950 this new tomb was damaged by rain. Consequently, the supports subsided and cracks appeared in the tomb. His death anniversary ('Urs) is held at this place every year again. Urs starts on 2nd Thursday of Har (Bikrami Calendar), which falls in the last 10 days of June and usually lasts 3 days. Thursday and Friday for men and Saturday for women.

Sadaat E Noshahia 
Noshahi, Noushahi, Noshahi Qadiri, is a sub branch of Hassani Sadaat the decedents of grand-son of the Islamic Prophet Muhammad . The name is used by the progeny of the 16th century sufi saint Syed Muhammad Nosha better known by his name Noshah pak also spelled as Nosho pak.

References

External links
SILSILA QADRIA NAUSHAHIA
FAYZAN-E NAUSHAH Second Edition – Biographies of the spiritual masters and saints of the Qādiriyah Naushāhiyah Order
Jamiyat Tablighul Islam - Home
Genealogy from Naushahi 17/02/06 - - PhpGedView – Up-to-date Family Tree of Muhammad Naushah Ganj Bakhsh Qadri

Phalia
1552 births
1654 deaths
People of Arab descent
Mughal Empire Sufis
Qadiri order
Punjabi people
Punjabi Sufi saints